Zhang Dayu (February 15, 1906 – February 20, 1989) was a Chinese chemist. He was a member of the Chinese Academy of Sciences.

References 

1906 births
1989 deaths
Members of the Chinese Academy of Sciences